Vatani Stadium (Vârzeshgah-e Vâtâni) is a multi-use stadium in Qa'em Shahr, Iran. It is currently used for football matches and is the home stadium of Persian Gulf Pro League team F.C. Nassaji Mazandaran The stadium holds 15,000 people.

References

External links
Stadium information

Football venues in Iran
Buildings and structures in Mazandaran Province
Sport in Mazandaran Province